Piopio is a small town in the Waitomo District. It is situated on  approximately 23 km from Te Kuiti.

Demographics
The settlement is part of the larger Aria statistical area.

Piopio had a population of 465 at the 2018 New Zealand census, an increase of 69 people (17.4%) since the 2013 census, and a decrease of 3 people (−0.6%) since the 2006 census. There were 171 households, comprising 234 males and 234 females, giving a sex ratio of 1.0 males per female, with 120 people (25.8%) aged under 15 years, 93 (20.0%) aged 15 to 29, 177 (38.1%) aged 30 to 64, and 78 (16.8%) aged 65 or older.

Ethnicities were 69.0% European/Pākehā, 49.0% Māori, 1.3% Pacific peoples, and 1.3% Asian. People may identify with more than one ethnicity.

Although some people chose not to answer the census's question about religious affiliation, 56.8% had no religion, 23.9% were Christian, 5.2% had Māori religious beliefs, 1.3% were Buddhist and 2.6% had other religions.

Of those at least 15 years old, 33 (9.6%) people had a bachelor's or higher degree, and 99 (28.7%) people had no formal qualifications. 30 people (8.7%) earned over $70,000 compared to 17.2% nationally. The employment status of those at least 15 was that 153 (44.3%) people were employed full-time, 72 (20.9%) were part-time, and 18 (5.2%) were unemployed.

Marae

There are marae in the area, affiliated with the hapū of Ngāti Maniapoto:
 Mōkau Kohunui Marae and Ko Tama Tāne meeting house are affiliated with Apakura, Ngāti Kinohaku and Waiora
 Napinapi Marae and Parekahoki meeting house are affiliated with Ngāti Matakore and Pare te Kawa
 Te Paemate Marae and meeting house are affiliated with Paemate
 Mangarama Mara and Rongorongo meeting house are affiliated with Apakura.

Education

Piopio College provides high school education for Year 7 to 13 students, with a roll of 

Both schools are coeducational. Rolls are as of

Notable people
 Hannah Osborne (born 1994), Olympic rower
 Merv Smith (1933–2018), broadcaster

References

External links
 Waitomo District Council

Populated places in Waikato
Waitomo District